The Israeli Fund for UNICEF is the Israeli non-profit and non-governmental organization that supports the United Nations Children's Fund (UNICEF).

The Israeli Fund for UNICEF, a volunteer-led education and fundraising organization, was first founded in 1969 by Ms. Zena Harman. Harman was already a good friend to UNICEF:  As a delegate of the Israeli government to the UNICEF Executive Board, she served as the Board’s Chairperson from 1963 to 1965, during which time, as Chair, she actually accepted the Nobel Prize in Oslo on behalf of UNICEF.  Back in Israel, she was elected the first Chair of the Israeli Fund for UNICEF.

The Israeli Fund opened its new Tel Aviv office in 2009 and is one of the 36 UNICEF national committees that support UNICEF worldwide through resource mobilization, advocacy, and education. As one of the newest members of the international UNICEF community, the Israeli Fund aims to promote children's rights within Israel and to make Israelis an active part of UNICEF's global efforts to save children's lives. 

The Israeli Fund's board of directors is chaired by Adv. Moriel Matalon and also includes Esther Guluma, Ron Guttmann, Gila Lapidot, Irith Rappaport, and Harriet Mouchly-Weiss.  

In October 2009, Mia Farrow, American actress and UNICEF Goodwill Ambassador, spent 6 days visiting Israel, Gaza, and the West Bank to draw attention to the impact of ongoing conflict on children and their families. Farrow spent a day in Sderot and met with children who told her about their experiences living under the constant threat of attack. Farrow also visited a psychological treatment center that received UNICEF support to treat Sderot children traumatized by the violence they experience in their daily lives. During the rest of her trip in Israel, Farrow toured Yad Vashem and the Shanti House- A Warm Home for Youth At-Risk in Tel Aviv. Throughout her time in Israel, Farrow was accompanied by Israeli Minister of Welfare and Social Services Isaac Herzog, Israeli Fund Chair Moriel Matalon, and board member Esther Guluma, former UNICEF director of West and Central Africa.

References

External links
 Official website: Israeli Fund for UNICEF

Children's charities based in Israel
UNICEF